The Olympic shrew (Sorex rohweri) is a rare species of shrew that lives in only 13 spots in northwest Washington state and, a recent discovery, in Burns Bog, located in Delta, BC.

Not much is known about this species.  It was only described in 2007 and is often mistaken for the masked shrew, Sorex cinereus. Recent reexaminations of museum specimens show the species occurs in British Columbia in the Fraser Valley south of the Fraser River, east to Chilliwack Lake.

Survival
Its survival in Canada is threatened by the South Fraser Perimeter Road, part 2 of the Gateway Program

References

 South Fraser Perimeter Road Description
 Surrey Now article

Sorex
Mammals described in 2007